A constitutional referendum was held in Paraguay on 4 August 1940. It saw voters approve the new constitution.

Background
In 1939, in the midst of a political stalemate, President José Félix Estigarribia dissolved Congress and assumed "temporary" dictatorial powers. The following year, he issued a new constitution. The key institution was a "strong, but not despotic" president who was vested with sweeping powers to suspend civil liberties and take actions that he deemed necessary for the good of the state. The Senate was abolished and the Chamber of Representatives limited in power. A new, corporatist-inspired Council of State was created to represent interests in business, farmers, bankers, the military, and the Roman Catholic Church.

Results

References

1940 constitutional
Constitutional referendum
Paraguayan constitutional
Constitutional referendums
Paraguayan constitutional referendum